Catastega aceriella, the maple trumpet skeletonizer moth, is a moth of the family Tortricidae. It is found in North America from southern Ontario and Nova Scotia to North Carolina and Tennessee.

The wingspan is 13–17 mm. Adults are greyish brown. There may be more than one generation per year.

The larvae feed on Acer species. They skeletonise the leaves of their host, resulting in a trumpet construction.

References

External links
Bug Guide

Eucosmini
Moths described in 1861